Delmotte is a small lunar impact crater that lies just to the east of the much larger crater Cleomedes, and to the north of the Mare Crisium, in the northeastern part of the Moon. Delmotte appears foreshortened when viewed from the Earth, although not sufficiently to obscure the interior details.

The crater rim is roughly circular, with a sharp-edged, slightly angular rim, and a slender inner wall. The northwestern part of the rim has a linear cleft that runs toward the northeast. The floor of the crater is relatively level. There are some patches of lighter albedo in the interior, with the most notable lying near the northern inner wall.

References

 
 
 
 
 
 
 
 
 
 
 
 

Impact craters on the Moon